Samuel J. Boyle IV (September 25, 1948 – February 3, 2008), known as Sam Boyle, served for two decades as Chief of The Associated Press' New York City bureau. He oversaw AP's coverage of high-profile events, including the 2001 terrorist attacks on the World Trade Center.

He was born in Philadelphia to a newspaper family. His father, Samuel Boyle, III, was a newspaper editor. An uncle, Robert Boyle, was an innovative editor for the Pottstown Mercury. His younger brother, Bill Boyle (who died in 2007 from cancer), had a long career including editorships in Philadelphia and at the New York Daily News for 21 years, where he rose to senior managing editor.

Sam Boyle joined the AP in Newark, New Jersey in 1971, then  transferred to the Philadelphia bureau in 1972. Over the next 7 years he moved from AP's political desk to the national desk at NYC headquarters, and then to deputy business editor. In 1981, Sam Boyle was appointed chief of bureau for West Virginia, and the following year he was named bureau chief in New York City.

When terrorist-hijacked airplanes destroyed the WTC's twin towers, Boyle managed the NYC bureau through its most tumultuous day ever, coordinating main stories and sidebars from staffers at desks and in the streets, even taking dictation by telephone.

With his wife, Suzanne O'Brien, he was active in animal rescue projects, finding homes for strays and adopting half a dozen dogs, including some older ones.

He died on February 3, 2008, aged 59, after a long battle with lung cancer. Just a few months previously he was forced, due to his illness,  to relinquish his role as an adjunct faculty member at Columbia University's Graduate School of Journalism, where he had taught for nearly two years.

External links
Obituary

1948 births
2008 deaths
American newspaper editors
Columbia University faculty
Writers from Philadelphia
Journalists from New York City
Journalists from Pennsylvania
Deaths from lung cancer in New York (state)
20th-century American journalists
American male journalists